"The Purloined Letter" is a short story by American author Edgar Allan Poe. It is the third of his three detective stories featuring the fictional C. Auguste Dupin, the other two being "The Murders in the Rue Morgue" and "The Mystery of Marie Rogêt". These stories are considered to be important early forerunners of the modern detective story. It first appeared in the literary annual The Gift for 1845 (1844) and soon was reprinted in numerous journals and newspapers.

Plot summary
The unnamed narrator is with the famous Parisian amateur detective C. Auguste Dupin when they are joined by G-, prefect of the Paris police. The prefect has a case he would like to discuss with Dupin.

A letter from the queen's lover has been stolen from her boudoir by the unscrupulous Minister D—. D— had been in the room, saw the letter, and switched it for a letter of no importance. He has since been blackmailing the queen.

The prefect makes two deductions with which Dupin does not disagree:
 The contents of the letter have not been revealed, as this would have led to certain circumstances that have not arisen. Therefore, Minister D— still has the letter in his possession.
 The ability to produce the letter at a moment's notice is almost as important as actual possession of the letter. Therefore, he must have the letter close at hand.

The prefect says that he and his police detectives have searched D—'s town house and have found nothing. They had checked behind the wallpaper and under the carpets. His men examined the tables and chairs with magnifying glasses and then probed the cushions with needles but have found no sign of interference; the letter is not hidden in these places. Dupin asks the prefect if he knows what he is seeking, and the prefect reads a minute description of the letter, which Dupin memorizes. The prefect then bids them good day.

A month later, the prefect returns, still unsuccessful in his search. He is motivated to continue his fruitless search by the promise of a large reward, recently doubled, upon the letter's safe return, and he will pay 50,000 francs to anyone who can help him. Dupin asks him to write that check now and he will give him the letter. The prefect is astonished, but knows that Dupin is not joking. He writes the check, and Dupin produces the letter. The prefect determines that it is genuine and races to deliver it to the queen.

Alone together, the narrator asks Dupin how he found the letter. Dupin explains the Paris police are competent within their limitations, but have underestimated with whom they are dealing. The prefect mistakes the Minister D— for a fool because he is a poet. For example, Dupin explains how an eight-year-old boy made a small fortune from his friends at a game called Odds and Evens. The boy had determined the intelligence of his opponents and played upon that to interpret their next move. He explains that D— knew the police detectives would have assumed that the blackmailer would have concealed the letter in an elaborate hiding place, and thus hid it in plain sight.

Dupin says he had visited the minister at his house (called a ‘hotel’ in line with Parisian word usage of the time). Complaining of weak eyes he wore a pair of green spectacles, the true purpose of which was to disguise his eyes as he searched for the letter. In a cheap card rack hanging from a dirty ribbon, he saw a half-torn letter and recognized it as the letter of the story's title. Striking up a conversation with D— about a subject in which the minister is interested, Dupin examined the letter more closely. It did not resemble the letter the prefect described so minutely; the writing was different, and it was sealed not with the "ducal arms" of the S— family, but with D—'s monogram. Dupin noticed that the paper was chafed as if the stiff paper was first rolled one way and then another. Dupin concluded that D— wrote a new address on the reverse of the stolen one, re-folded it the opposite way and sealed it with his own seal.

Dupin left a snuff box behind as an excuse to return the next day. Resuming the same conversation they had begun the previous day, D— was startled by a gunshot in the street. While he went to investigate, Dupin switched D—'s letter for a duplicate.

Dupin explains that the gunshot distraction was arranged by him and that he left a duplicate letter to ensure his ability to leave the hotel without D— suspecting his actions. If he had tried to seize it openly, Dupin surmises D— might have had him killed. As both a political supporter of the queen and old enemy of the minister [who had done an evil deed to Dupin in Vienna in the past], Dupin also hopes that D— will try to use the power he no longer has, to his political downfall, and at the end be presented with a quotation from Prosper Jolyot de Crébillon's play Atrée et Thyeste that implies Dupin was the thief: Un dessein si funeste, S'il n'est digne d'Atrée, est digne de Thyeste (If such a sinister design isn't worthy of Atreus, it is worthy of Thyestes).

Publication history
 This story first appeared in The Gift: A Christmas and New Year's Present for 1845, published in December, 1844 in Philadelphia by Carey and Hart. Poe earned $12 for its first printing. It later was included in the 1845 collection Tales by Edgar A. Poe.

Analysis
The epigraph "" (Nothing is more hateful to wisdom than excessive cleverness) attributed by Poe to Seneca was not found in Seneca's known work. It is from Petrarch's treatise "De Remediis utriusque Fortunae". Poe probably took the reference from Samuel Warren's novel Ten Thousand a-Year.

Dupin is not a professional detective. In "The Murders in the Rue Morgue", Dupin takes the case for amusement and refuses a financial reward. In "The Purloined Letter", however, Dupin undertakes the case for financial gain and personal revenge. He is not motivated by pursuing truth, emphasized by the lack of information about the contents of the purloined letter. Dupin's innovative method to solve the mystery is by trying to identify with the criminal. The minister and Dupin have equally matched minds, combining skills of mathematician and poet, and their battle of wits is threatened to end in stalemate. Dupin wins because of his moral strength: the minister is "unprincipled," a blackmailer who obtains power by exploiting the weakness of others.

"The Purloined Letter" completes Dupin's tour of different settings. In "The Murders in the Rue Morgue," he travels through city streets; in "The Mystery of Marie Rogêt," he is in the wide outdoors; in "The Purloined Letter," he is in an enclosed private space. French linguist Jean-Claude Milner suggests  Dupin and D— are brothers, based on the final reference to Atreus and his twin brother Thyestes.

Literary significance and criticism
In May 1844, just before its first publication, Poe wrote to James Russell Lowell that he considered "The Purloined Letter" "perhaps the best of my tales of ratiocination." When it was republished in The Gift in 1845, the editor called it "one of the aptest illustrations which could well be conceived of that curious play of two minds in one person."

Poe's story provoked a debate among literary theorists in the 1960s and 1970s. Jacques Lacan argued in Ecrits that the content of the queen's letter is irrelevant to the story and that the proper "place" of the signifier (the letter itself) is determined by the symbolic structure in which it exists and is displaced, first by the minister and then by Dupin. Jacques Derrida responded to Lacan's reading in "Le Facteur de la vérité" ("The Purveyor of Truth"), questioning Lacan's structuralist assumptions.  The triangular relationships that Lacan claims are foundational to the story are not, in fact, more foundational than other structured relationships one can perceive in it.  Derrida sees Lacan's reading as yet another structuralism attempting to establish an ultimate, foundational truth to the story.  In reality, according to Derrida, none of the structural schemas one can see in the story are more foundational than any other.  Lacan's structuralist reading and Derrida's deconstructive reading provoked a response by Barbara Johnson, who mediated the debate by suggesting that the letter belongs all along to the queen as a substitute for a phallus.

Donald E. Pease suggests that Lacan "equates the possession of a letter—defined as a 'lack' of content—with 'literal' as opposed to 'symbolic' castration, hence the odor of the feminine. In other words the 'possession' of the lack otherwise displaced by language identifies the possessor with the lack 'she' thinks she possesses. So femininity exists as an 'effect' of the delusion of possession of a lack otherwise displaced (as a masculine effect?) by the endless purloining of the letter."

The debate up to the mid-1980s is collected in a helpful though incomplete volume titled The Purloined Poe. The volume does not include, for instance, Richard Hull's reading based on the work of Michel Foucault, in which he argues that "'The Purloined Letter' is a good text for questioning the metalinguistic claim that artists can't avoid doing surveillance, because it is a discourse on poetry's superiority over surveillance." Slavoj Žižek asks "So why does a letter always arrive at its destination? Why could it not—sometimes at least—also fail to reach it?" Hollis Robbins critiques Derrida for his own blindness to patriotism in prefacing his reading of "The Purloined Letter" with a reading of "The Emperor's New Clothes": "In Derrida's view, both Poe's story and Andersen's feature a king whose manhood is imperiled, who is surrounded by habit-driven and ineffectual civil servants, and who is saved by an individual who sees what is obvious. ... Both save the crown from further embarrassment. ... There is never a question that a king could or should fall from grace."

Adaptations
 In 1948, NBC University Theater aired an adaptation starring Adolphe Menjou as C. Auguste Dupin.
"The Purloined Letter" was adapted in an episode of the 1950s television series Suspense, but the events were portrayed in a linear fashion.
 In 1995, the story was adapted for an episode of the children's television program Wishbone. The episode was titled "The Pawloined Paper".
 In 2013 a theatrical adaptation of the story by Lance Tait was published. Ava Caridad wrote that "The Purloined Letter...lends itself well to a one-act play."

References

Sources

External links

 "The Purloined Letter" at American Literature
 Full text on PoeStories.com with hyperlinked vocabulary words
 Dept. of English, fju.edu analyzes the story with the help of diagrams
 Seminar on "The Purloined Letter", Écrits, transl. by Jeffrey Mehlman, "French Freud" in Yale French Studies 48, 1972.
 

1844 short stories
Detective fiction short stories
Short stories by Edgar Allan Poe
Short stories set in Paris
Works originally published in American magazines
Works originally published in literary magazines